Maharashtra State Highway 265 SH265 is a normal state highway in Nagpur, in the state of Maharashtra.  This state highway touches Savner, Kalmeshwar, and Gondakhari National Highway 53.State Highway 275 (Maharashtra)

Summary 

This road is  one of the important road in Nagpur District providing connectivity with  three National Highway NH 69, NH 26 B, and NH-6.

Major junctions 

 This highway started from the intersection at Savner town with NH 69,crossing MH SH 248, at Kalmeshwar, NH-6 at Gondkhari village and end at Mohagoan village connecting with MH SH 255.

Connections 
Many villages, cities and towns in Nagpur District are connecting by this state highway.
Savner
Adasa
Dapewada
Kalmeshwar
Gondkhari

Other Important Landmark on this highway.

 Veena Dam
 Zilpi Lake
 MIDC Kalmeshwar
 Dapewada Vittal Temple
 Adasa Ganpati Temple.

See also 
 List of State Highways in Maharashtra

References 

State Highways in Maharashtra
State Highways in Nagpur District